Diomedia may refer to:

 Diomideia, a location in Xanthi, Greece
 Islands of Diomedes, a location in Greek mythology

See also
 Diomedea, a genus of seabirds